IBRA may refer to:

Places
 Ibra,  a city in the Ash Sharquiyah Region of Oman
 Ibra (Aula), a river in Hesse, Germany
 IBRA (capitalized),  the Interim biogeographic regionalisation of Australia

Organizations
 International Bee Research Association, charity for bee research and education
 BPPN, Indonesian Bank Restructuring Agency

Sports
 Zlatan Ibrahimović (born 1981), Swedish footballer (often called 'Ibra' or 'Ibracadabra')